Freedom Acres is a census-designated place (CDP) in Gila County, Arizona, United States. The population was 90 at the 2020 census, up from 84 at the 2010 census.

Geography
It is bordered to the north by the Beaver Valley CDP. The East Verde River forms the northern and western edge of the Freedom Acres CDP, and Shoofly Canyon forms the southwestern edge.

Demographics

References

Census-designated places in Gila County, Arizona